Lee Merton "Dewey" Bunnell (born 19 January 1952) is a British-American musician, singer, guitarist, and songwriter, best known as a member of the folk rock band America.

Biography
Bunnell was born in Harrogate, Yorkshire, England, to an American serviceman father, stationed at the United States Air Force base at RAF South Ruislip, and his English wife. As a young musician, Bunnell was inspired by the Beatles and the Beach Boys.

While attending London Central High School in England, he met Gerry Beckley and Dan Peek. After an initial attempt at forming a band in the late 1960s, the trio formed America in 1969 and released their first album in 1971.

As with the other members, Bunnell wrote, sang and played guitar.  His best-known compositions include "A Horse with No Name", "Ventura Highway", and "Tin Man". Bunnell has explained that "A Horse with No Name" was "a metaphor for a vehicle to get away from life's confusion into a quiet, peaceful place", while "Sandman" was inspired by his casual talks with returning Vietnam veterans. Afraid that they might be attacked and killed in their sleep, many of them chose to stay awake as long as possible, either naturally or with pharmaceuticals. Thus, they were "running from the Sandman."

In 1973, he moved to Marin County, California with his then-wife, Vivien. They had two children, Dylan and Lauren. The two divorced in 1999 and he married Penny in 2002. He then legally adopted Penny's daughter, Destry.

Bunnell is still a member of America, along with the remaining founding member, Gerry Beckley.  America has made more than 20 albums of original material, along with a number of hits compilations, between the 1960s and the present. In 2002, the band released a holiday album entitled Holiday Harmony. America's album Back Pages was released on 26 July 2011. The group was given a star on the Hollywood Walk of Fame in February 2012.  America's most recent album, Lost & Found, was officially released 5 May 2015, containing unreleased tracks recorded between 2002 and 2010.

References

External links

1952 births
Living people
British soft rock musicians
Musicians from Harrogate
English male singer-songwriters
English people of American descent
American rock guitarists
America (band) members
American folk guitarists
American male guitarists
American folk singers
American pop guitarists
People from Palos Verdes, California
20th-century American guitarists
20th-century American male musicians
American male singer-songwriters
Singer-songwriters from California